From the posterior wall of the saccule a canal, the endolymphatic duct, is given off; this duct is joined by the utriculosaccular duct, and then passes along the vestibular aqueduct and ends in a blind pouch, the endolymphatic sac, on the posterior surface of the petrous portion of the temporal bone, where it is in contact with the dura mater. Studies suggest that the endolymphatic duct and endolymphatic sac perform both absorptive and secretory, as well as phagocytic  and immunodefensive, functions.

Neoplasms of the endolymphatic sac are very rare tumors.

References

External links
 Images at wustl.edu

Vestibular system